Ronan Alan Kratt (born September 2, 2003) is a Canadian professional soccer player who plays for Regionalliga Nord club Werder Bremen II, on loan from York United.

Early life
Kratt is the son Laura Wilkinson Kratt and Martin Kratt, one of the Kratt brothers, who are American zoologists and children's educational television show hosts, who starred in shows such as Zoboomafoo and Wild Kratts, the latter of which Ronan appeared in as a child.

Kratt began playing youth soccer with Ottawa South United at age six, who were able to arrange multiple training opportunities in Spain with Spanish club Barcalona's La Masia academy. In March 2016, he had week-long trials with English club Crewe Alexandra and German club Bayern Munich. In 2018, he moved to the United States, where he played two seasons with the Barca Residency Academy in Arizona.

In January 2020, at the age of 16, he committed to attend Carleton University and play for the men's soccer team beginning in September 2021, turning down NCAA Division I offers. However, he ultimately did not attend Carleton, instead moving to Germany to join SSV Ulm's U19 side in the summer of 2021.

Club career
In 2020, Kratt played with Ottawa South United in the Première ligue de soccer du Québec.

In the 2021–22 season, he spent most of the season with SSV Ulm's U19 side, but made one appearance for the senior side in the fourth tier Regionalliga Südwest on March 19 against Mainz 05 II as a late game substitute.

On June 17, 2022, Kratt signed a professional contract with Canadian Premier League club York United, effective the beginning of July. He made his debut on July 8, starting the match against Forge FC. He scored his first goal in the next game on July 15 against Pacific FC. After the season, York arranged for him to go on a training stint with Werder Bremen II. In January 2023, he joined Werder Bremen II on loan until July 1, with a purchase option that will activate if Kratt makes a certain number of appearances.

International career
Kratt is eligible to play for both Canada and the United States.

In April 2016, he attended a couple of camps at the United States Soccer Training Centre with the United States youth teams.

In April 2022, he was named to a training camp for the Canada U20 team. He made his debut in a pair of friendlies that month against Costa Rica U20.

Career statistics

Filmography

Television

References

External links

Ronan Kratt at FuPa

2003 births
Living people
Canadian people of American descent
Canadian soccer players
Soccer players from Ottawa
Association football forwards
Canada men's youth international soccer players
Première ligue de soccer du Québec players
Regionalliga players
Canadian Premier League players
Ottawa South United players
SSV Ulm 1846 players
York United FC players
SV Werder Bremen II players
Canadian expatriate soccer players
Canadian expatriate sportspeople in Germany
Expatriate footballers in Germany